Fardhem IF is a Swedish football club located in Fardhem on the island of Gotland.

Background
Fardhem IF currently plays in Division 3, the fifth tier of Swedish football, after winning the 2011 Division 4 Gotland division and thus earning promotion to the fifth tier league. They play their home matches at the Fardhem IP in Hemse.

The club is affiliated to Gotlands Fotbollförbund. Fardhem/Garda IK have competed in the Svenska Cupen on 8 occasions.

Season to season

Footnotes

External links
 Fardhem IF – Official website

Football clubs in Gotland County